Palair Assembly constituency is a constituency of Telangana Legislative Assembly, India. It is one of 10 constituencies in Khammam district. It is part of Khammam Lok Sabha constituency.

Thummala Nageswara Rao, was Roads & Buildings Minister of Telangana representing the constituency before losing to Kandala Upender Reddy in Telangana Assembly Elections in 2018.

Mandals
The Assembly constituency presently comprises the following mandals:

Members of Legislative Assembly

Election results

Telangana Legislative Assembly Election, 2018

Telangana Legislative Assembly By election, 2016 
The by-election was necessitated following the death of Congress Member R.Venkat Reddy who won the seat in 2014. T. Nageshwar Rao of Telangana Rashtra Samithi won it with the biggest majority in the history of Paleru constituency.

Telangana Legislative Assembly election, 2014

See also
 List of constituencies of Telangana Legislative Assembly

References

Assembly constituencies of Telangana
Khammam district